Berks Catholic High School is a four-year comprehensive coeducational Roman Catholic preparatory secondary school located in Reading, Pennsylvania, in the United States. It was formed out of a merger of Holy Name High School and Reading Central Catholic High School in 2011. It is approved and accredited by the Middle States Association of Colleges and Secondary Schools, the Commonwealth of Pennsylvania, and the Diocese of Allentown.

History
Following the 2010-2011 academic year, the Diocese of Allentown under Bishop John Barres closed both Holy Name High School and Reading Central Catholic High School. The Diocese then established Berks Catholic High School, which officially opened on July 1, 2011, on the site of the former Holy Name High School.

The school's first Principal was Tony Balistere from 2011 until 2019 after his promotion to a diocesan job in Allentown. Alice Einoff was principal for the 2019–2020 and 2020–2021 academic years during the COVID-19 pandemic during which many months of school instruction were online.

In the late 2010s, Berks Catholic had capacity issues since the school could not support the number of students attending.  A $9 million expansion project was completed by the beginning of the 2018 school year to fix this issue.

Students

The average SAT score is 1160. The School is 53% female and 47% male. The racial makeup of the school is 61.3% Caucasian, 25% Hispanic, 2.9% Asian, and 2.5% African American with the rest of the student population being of other races or international students. The colleges with the highest matriculation rate are Penn State, Temple University, The University of Pittsburgh, Drexel University, St. Joseph’s University, Alvernia University, and West Chester University. Between 94 and 100 percent of students at Berks Catholic choose to attend college after graduating.

Education

Berks Catholic offers advanced placement courses.

Athletics

Boys
Bowling
Basketball
Football
Golf
Lacrosse
Soccer
Tennis
Track and field
Volleyball 
Wrestling

Girls
Basketball
Bowling
Cheerleading (fall and winter)
Field hockey
Golf
Lacrosse
Softball
Soccer
Tennis
Track and Field
Volleyball

Berks Catholic’s only win in a state championship for a team sport was in girls volleyball in 2015.

Saints football

Playoff appearances and history  
The Berks Catholic football program was formed in 2011 with a merger of the Holy Name Blue Jays and the Central Catholic Cardinals, former cross-town rivals. The Blue Jays’ head Coach, Rick Keeley, became the coach of the Saints. Keeley still holds this job as of September 2021. In its existence the program has enjoyed much success.  The Saints’ first appearance in the playoffs was in their second year of play in 2012, they appeared again in the years 2013, 2014, 2015, 2016, 2017, 2018, 2019, and 2021. They have only missed playoffs twice as of November 2021, in their first year and during the COVID-19 pandemic in 2020, where the criteria for choosing a playoff team was different.

Championships and awards 
Berks Catholic has won the PIAA District III championship a total of four times, twice in their time spent in AA in 2013 and in 2015 against local rival Wyomissing and twice in AAAA in 2016 and 2017. They have been coached by Rick Keeley since 2011. During his time as coach, Keeley won Eastern PA Football’s 4-A coach of the year award in 2016.

Rivalries 
Berks Catholic’s historic rival in athletics is the Wyomissing Spartans, both Berks County football powerhouses. This began as one of Holy Name’s two rivalries, the other impossible to carry on the tradition of during the forming of the new school because the other rival was the school they were merging with, Central Catholic. The series is called the Backyard Brawl and it was played annually from 2011 to 2019. The Keeley-Wolfram trophy (named after each team’s coach) was introduced in 2012 and memorializes the matchup. The Spartans lead in trophy wins but the Saints lead the overall series 6-5 thanks to the times the Spartans and Saints met in the playoffs before the Saints joined PIAA AAAA. The meeting has not taken place in football since 2019, when Wyomissing stopped scheduling non-required matchups with Berks Catholic. The match up is set to re-commence in September 2022 due to a conference merger. In the years without the Backyard Brawl, the game between Berks Catholic and Exeter Township Senior High School was the most spirited local match up.

Anthony Myers and 17 Strong

Anthony Myers was a track runner and football running back and cornerback for Berks Catholic High School. He was a talented player who lettered in football his freshman year. On October 21, 2018, he had a seizure, was taken to the hospital and was diagnosed with Stage III anaplastic astrocytoma, a rare form of brain cancer. Upon receiving his diagnosis, he told his father "Take me to practice." After his diagnoses, he was cleared to play for one final football game, a playoff game against The Milton Hershey School. During his final game, Myers scored two touchdowns, the second on a notable 80-yard punt return.

Myers received a huge amount of support from the local community, including the Philadelphia Eagles; he got to meet with then Eagles coach Doug Pederson and Alshon Jeffery with whom he shared the jersey number 17, among other Eagles and New York Giants players when he attended a game where he and the Berks Catholic Football team were granted 50 sideline tickets. He received a video supporting him which had many high school teams and sports stars sending messages of support, including Villanova basketball coach Jay Wright, JJ Redick of the Philadelphia Seventy Sixers and Kentucky basketball coach John Calipari wishing Myers well. Myers also appeared on NFL Network’s Good Morning Football and was given free tickets to Super Bowl LIII. His cancer treatment was documented on social media as 17 Strong and many t-shirts and other items bearing the words "17 Strong" or "Take Me to Practice" were sold during his treatment to support the Anthony Myers Movement, a charity founded by Myers. The non-profit organization's stated goals are family financial assistance, retreat and respite aid, aid for medical education, and medical research funding.
On December 4, 2018, after several weeks of his condition worsening, Myers died in his home surrounded by love ones. Berks Catholic retired his football letter during and before the 2020–2021 season the AstroTurf Corporation donated two patches that had a large gold and white “17” marking the 17 yard line on the football field at Berks Catholic. Myers was honored at the football team’s class of 2021 senior night and at the class of 2021’s graduation ceremony.

References

External links 
 Official website

2011 establishments in Pennsylvania
Catholic secondary schools in Pennsylvania
Buildings and structures in Reading, Pennsylvania
Educational institutions established in 2011
Roman Catholic Diocese of Allentown
Schools in Berks County, Pennsylvania